Discount points, also called mortgage points or simply points, are a form of pre-paid interest available in the United States when arranging a mortgage. One point equals one percent of the loan amount. By charging a borrower points, a lender effectively increases the yield on the loan above the amount of the stated interest rate.  Borrowers can offer to pay a lender points as a method to reduce the interest rate on the loan, thus obtaining a lower monthly payment in exchange for this up-front payment. For each point purchased, the loan rate is typically reduced by anywhere from 1/8% (0.125%) to 1/4% (0.25%).

Selling the property or refinancing prior to this break-even point will result in a net financial loss for the buyer while keeping the loan for longer than this break-even point will result in a net financial savings for the buyer. Accordingly, if the intention is to buy and sell the property or refinance, paying points will cost more than just paying the higher interest rate.

Points may also be purchased to reduce the monthly payment for the purpose of qualifying for a loan.  Loan qualification based on monthly income versus the monthly loan payment may sometimes only be achievable by reducing the monthly payment through the purchasing of points to buy down the interest rate, thereby reducing the monthly loan payment.

Discount points may be different from origination fee, mortgage arrangement fee or broker fee. Discount points are always used to buy down the interest rates, while origination fees sometimes are fees the lender charges for the loan or sometimes just another name for buying down the interest rate. Origination fee and discount points are both items listed under lender-charges on the HUD-1 Settlement Statement.

The difference in savings over the life of the loan can make paying points a benefit to the borrower. Any significant changes in fees should be re-disclosed in the final good faith estimate (GFE).

Also directly related to points is the concept of the 'no closing cost loan', in which the consumer accepts a higher interest rate in return for the lender paying the loan's closing costs up front.  In some cases a purchaser can negotiate with the seller to get them to pay seller's points which can be used to pay mortgage points.

References

External links
 irs.gov/publications/p936 – IRS Form 936 defines a point for the purpose of deducting mortgage interest for U.S. income taxes

Mortgage
Mathematical finance
Interest